Sanchai Ratiwatana and Sonchat Ratiwatana were the defending champions but decided not to participate.
Jamie Delgado and Jonathan Marray won this tournament by defeating Frank Moser and David Škoch 6–1, 6–4 in the final.

Seeds

Draw

Draw

External links
 Main Draw

Intersport Heilbronn Open - Doubles
2011 Doubles